Psychrobacillus soli is a Gram-positive, endospore-forming, psychrotolerant and aerobic bacterium from the genus of Psychrobacillus which has been isolated from oil contaminated soil. Psychrobacillus soli has the ability to degrade oil.

References

 

Bacillaceae
Bacteria described in 2015